The Minor League Golf Tour is a developmental professional golf tour headquartered in Jupiter, Florida that runs tournaments year-round in south Florida. The tour runs a year-round event schedule with a combination of one-day, two-day, and three-day tournament formats.

History
The Minor League Golf Tour was founded in 2004.

Alumni
According to the tour, 77 players that had played on the Minor League Golf Tour had status on The PGA Tour or Web.com Tour in 2019. Minor League Golf Tour Alumni include Brooks Koepka and Lexi Thompson.

Q-School contests
The Minor League Golf Tour Q-School contests give players the opportunity to earn PGA, Web.com, or Champions Tour status by winning events that create a similar atmosphere to Qualifying School. In April 2009 The Minor League Golf Tour offered to pay the entry to PGA Tour Qualifying School to the leading money winner of a series of events. Brett Bergeron and Justin Peters won the 2009 contests, with Peters going on to earn conditional Nationwide Tour status for 2010.  Justin Peters has a tour record 28 victories.  The contest winners for 2010 included golf instructor Jim McLean's son Jon McLean, Steve LeBrun, Dustin Cone, Brian Anderson, and Sunny Kim.

References

External links

Professional golf tours
Golf in Florida